Mary Louise Easson (née Alexander) (born 16 June 1955) is an Australian politician. She was an Australian Labor Party member of the Australian House of Representatives from 1993 to 1996, representing the Sydney-based electorate of Lowe.

Early life and career

Easson was born in Melbourne and was educated at Star of the Sea College. She joined the Labor Party at eighteen, and was the Victorian state president and the national vice-president of Australian Young Labor in 1976. She worked thereafter as a political research officer for Frank Crean and Ben Humphreys between 1976 and 1979, as a public affairs manager for Australian Consolidated Industries from 1979 to 1985, a human resources manager with Ansett Airlines from 1985 to 1990 and a business consultant from 1990 to 1993. She became a member of the board of UNICEF in 1988 and subsequently served as its national secretary. She was the unsuccessful Labor candidate for Lowe at the 1990 federal election.

In parliament

She was elected to the House of Representatives on her second attempt at the 1993 federal election, defeating Liberal shadow health spokesperson Bob Woods after a redistribution shifted the marginal seat in Labor's favour. The result was touted as a "surprise" victory that the party had not expected to win, with voter concern over Liberal proposals around Medicare (in Woods' portfolio) and the future of the Sydney Airport curfew and a campaign having reportedly been significant. Easson's campaign was widely praised in the days after the election. She was a member of the Labor Right faction.

Easson was touted as a potential candidate for a ministry or parliamentary secretary role, but remained on the backbench. A devout Catholic, in 1994 she jointly drafted a petition of MPs protesting the ABC broadcast of highlights of the Sydney Gay and Lesbian Mardi Gras. She supported affirmative action for women candidates within Labor, arguing that it would help the party win seats.

By late 1994, aircraft noise from Sydney Airport was emerging as a major issue to contend with, with the closure of the east–west runway placing pressure on Easson and other MPs representing areas surrounding the airport, while she also faced pressure over a controversial government decision to expand woodchip exports. In the leadup to the 1996 election, the aircraft noise issue became an increasingly dominant issue; she was "pushed to the forefront" of the debate, but was prevented from crossing the floor to support a John Howard-written amendment that would have reopened the east–west runway and reduced noise in her electorate. The Sydney Morning Herald wrote that the Labor Party had "helped and cruelled her prospects", but that she was "unlikely to resist the backlash on noise". By January 1996, amidst poor Labor polling statewide, media reports suggested that she would struggle to hold her seat, with clashing policies over airport noise emerging as a key campaign issue. She was easily defeated amidst the Labor landslide defeat at the 1996 federal election by Liberal candidate and former state MP Paul Zammit.

Post-politics

Following her 1996 defeat, she was touted as a candidate either for Paul Keating's federal seat of Blaxland or for Zammit's former state seat of Strathfield; neither eventuated, with Keating's support for his staffer Michael Hatton blocking her in Blaxland, and she specifically out a career in state politics.

In 1996, she founded public affairs firm Probity International. In 1998, The Australian reported a corporate source saying of Easson: "People know that if you want anything from Labor you go to her.".

Easson was elected to the board of NRMA on Nicholas Whitlam's ticket in October 1997, becoming deputy president in November 2000. She resigned from the NRMA board in late 2001, seeking to focus on her role as director of its demutalised sister company NRMA Insurance. She continued as a board member of NRMA Insurance (later IAG Group) until her retirement in late 2003.

In 2003, she stood as a candidate for national president of the Labor Party, having been nominated by Queensland Premier Peter Beattie with support from the NSW Right; however, she was unsuccessful. She also served a stint as chairperson of Life Education NSW during the 2000s.

She was seriously ill in 2009, spending 70 days in intensive care and six months in hospital.

In 2016, Easson's lobbying activities drew attention due to Probity International's work for Israeli weapons manufacturer Elbit at the same time as Easson had emerged an influential pro-Israel voice within the party's debates over policy on Israel-Palestine and as a member of the Australia Israel Labor Dialogue, which was funding trips for MPs to Israel to support their platform. She denied that Elbit had donated to AILD, but was met with criticism from opposing Labor MPs: Bob Carr stated that any connection to Elbit was "a shameful look — arms dealers, civilian deaths, the electronic fence" and called for transparency as to their fundraising, while Melissa Parke said of the situation: "it is a concern not to know who is providing the funds, particularly where there is a person associated with an Israeli weapons manufacturer on the AILD committee".

She published a book about the history of Australia's retirement incomes and superannuation system, Keating’s and Kelty’s Super Legacy, in 2017.

Personal life

She married Michael Easson, later an influential unionist and secretary of the Labor Council of New South Wales, in 1984. They have two daughters.

References

Living people
Australian Labor Party members of the Parliament of Australia
Members of the Australian House of Representatives
Members of the Australian House of Representatives for Lowe
Politicians from Melbourne
Women members of the Australian House of Representatives
1955 births
20th-century Australian politicians
20th-century Australian women politicians
People educated at Star of the Sea College, Melbourne